No 32–04 \ vd is part of a tranche of secret Russian documents known as the Kremlin papers, allegedly leaked by insiders in the Kremlin, with a summary thought to be authored by Vladimir Symonenko.  The report outlines a plan to put Donald J. Trump into the White House in 2016 to promote Russian interests and to weaken the United States.  The report also discusses the existence of kompromat on Trump, so-called compromising material, according to the document, collected from Trump's previous visits to Russia.

The papers describe Trump as an "impulsive, mentally unstable and unbalanced individual" who suffers from "an inferiority complex".  The author recommended using "all possible force to facilitate his election to the post of US president".  Based on the release, it is thought that Vladimir Putin approved of the operation on January 22, 2016, at a private meeting of the Russian national security council.  During that meeting, it was determined by a Russian spy agency that they would hack US targets to collect information and prepare measures towards helping Trump.

Shortly after the meeting, it is believed that Putin set up a commission to influence the 2016 US presidential election headed by Russia's defense minister Sergei Shoigu.  He directed GRU military intelligence, SVR foreign intelligence and the FSB to work towards electing Trump as president. Just a few months later, on March 19, Russian hackers sent phishing emails to Hillary Clinton's campaign chairman John Podesta, resulting in the Podesta emails release, followed weeks later by the Russian attack on the Democratic National Committee.

See also
Timeline of Russian interference in the 2016 United States elections

References

Further reading
Thalen, Mikael (July 15, 2021). "Disinformation experts raise questions over leak ‘proving’ Putin helped Trump in 2016". The Daily Dot. Retrieved January 27, 2023.
Ray, Siladitya (July 15, 2021). "Trump Kompromat Claimed: Kremlin Documents Reportedly Show Putin Conspiring For Billionaire". Forbes. Retrieved January 27, 2023.

Russian interference in the 2016 United States elections